Johannes Petrus "Johan" Roux (born 25 February 1969) is a retired South African rugby player, who played for the South Africa national rugby union team.

Career

Provincial 
He played 111 matches for Transvaal or the Golden Lions and was a member of the teams that won the Currie Cup in 1993 and 1994. In 1993 he was selected for the South African Barbarians, to tour the United Kingdom.

International 
Roux made his test debut for the Springboks against  on 11 June 1994 at Newlands in Cape Town. He was member of the 1995 World Cup squad, playing in three matches during the tournament. Roux also played in five tour matches, scoring two tries for the Springboks.

Test history

Accolades
In 1993, Roux was nominated one of the five most Promising Players of the Year (under-23), along with FP Naude, Ryno Opperman, Krynauw Otto and Christiaan Scholtz.

See also
List of South Africa national rugby union players – Springbok no. 607

References

External links
 
  Springboks beat England 27-9 in 1994

South African rugby union players
South Africa international rugby union players
Rugby union scrum-halves
1969 births
Living people
Golden Lions players
Lions (United Rugby Championship) players
Rugby union players from Pretoria